Església de Sant Esteve de Bixessarri is a church located in Bixessarri, Sant Julià de Lòria Parish, Andorra. It is a heritage property registered in the Cultural Heritage of Andorra. It was built in 1701.

References

Sant Julià de Lòria
Roman Catholic churches in Andorra
Cultural Heritage of Andorra
Roman Catholic churches completed in 1701
1701 establishments in Europe
18th-century Roman Catholic church buildings